The Mackenzie River, an inland intermittent river of the Wimmera catchment, is located in the Grampians region of the Australian state of Victoria.

Course and features
The Mackenzie River rises on the northern slopes of the Great Dividing Range, and flows generally west by north, joined by one minor tributary, before reaching its mouth to flow into the Wimmera River at Haven; southwest of Horsham. The Mackenzie River descends  over its  course.

The river is crossed by the Henty Highway, south of Horsham.

Etymology
In the local Aboriginal language the river is named Bun-nah, meaning "tea-tree scrub"; and in the Jardwadjali language, Bunud, meaning "mallee tree, tea-tree scrub".

See also

 List of rivers of Victoria

References

Wimmera catchment
Rivers of Grampians (region)
Grampians (national park)